is a Japanese kickboxer. Takahashi competes mainly in shoot boxing, where she became the runner-up in the 2010 Shoot Boxing Girls S-Cup tournament and is a former Shoot Boxing Japan women's flyweight champion.

Background

Shoot boxing and kickboxing career

The referee stopped the fight in the second round when Takahashi was punching Saioka, who was already injured on the chin.

On , at Jewels 9th Ring, Takahashi faced and defeated Emiko Matsumoto by TKO (punches) in the third round.

On , at the 2010 Shoot Boxing Girls S-Cup, Takahashi was able to defeat Australian kickboxer Christina Jurjevic in the first round and Mei Yamaguchi in the semi-finals after an extra round, both by unanimous decision. She was stopped in the final by 2009 winner Rena Kubota in a bout that went two extra rounds to determine the winner.

She faced and defeated in dominant fashion American mixed martial artist Karina Hallinan by unanimous decision after three rounds.

Aree by TKO (knees).

On , at Shoot Boxing 2011 Act 3: SB169, Takahashi had a rematch against Rena Kubota, who was coming off of a negative result in an exhibition match against Erika Kamimura, this time for the vacant Shoot Boxing Japan women's flyweight championship. With Takahashi dominating the fight during the second half of the match, she was awarded the unanimous decision after five rounds and became the new titleholder.

Takahashi was next scheduled to face Erika Kamimura in a super fight at the 2011 Shoot Boxing Girls S-Cup. Takahashi, however, suffered an injury during training and was unable to face Kamimura on that date. She is expected to face Kamimura under RISE rules in the future.

She was defeated by unanimous decision after one extension round.

On , Takahashi faced Rio Kamikaze at Shoot Boxing 2012: Road To S-Cup, Act.3. The fight was a semi-final matchup in the Shoot Boxing Girls S-Cup 53.5 kilogram tournament. Takahashi defeated Kamikaze by unanimous decision to advance to the tournament final.

She was defeated by unanimous decision after six rounds.

On , Takahashi faced Itsuka Yokose in a kickboxing match at RISE/M-1MC: Infinity in Tokyo, Japan. Takahashi defeated Yokose by TKO (punches) in the third round.

However, Song withdrew from the fight and Takahashi instead faced Mi-Jeon Chan. She defeated Chan by TKO in the third round.

On , Takahashi entered the 2013 Shoot Boxing Girls S-Cup 53.5 tournament. She defeated Wei-Ting Chen and Rio Kamikaze, but lost to Mizuki Inoue in the tournament final.

She was scheduled to fight Miyumi Takahashi at Shootboxing 2014: Act 1 on February 23, 2014, but the fight was scrapped due to illness.

Shoot boxing and kickboxing record

|-
|-  bgcolor="CCFFCC"
| 2013-11-16 || Win ||align=left| Miyo Yoshida || Shoot Boxing Battle Summit: Ground Zero Tokyo 2013 || Tokyo, Japan || Decision (Unanimous) || 3 || 3:00 || 18-5
|-  bgcolor="FFBBBB"
| 2013-08-03 || Loss ||align=left| Mizuki Inoue || Shoot Boxing Girls S-Cup 2013, final || Tokyo, Japan || Decision (Unanimous) || 3 || 2:00 || 17-5
|-
! style=background:white colspan=9 |
|-
|-  bgcolor="CCFFCC"
| 2013-08-03 || Win ||align=left| Rio Kamikaze || Shoot Boxing Girls S-Cup 2013, semi-final || Tokyo, Japan || Decision (Unanimous) || 4 (Ex.1) || 2:00 || 17-4
|-
! style=background:white colspan=9 |
|-
|-  bgcolor="CCFFCC"
| 2013-08-03 || Win ||align=left| Wei-Ting Chen || Shoot Boxing Girls S-Cup 2013, quarterfinal || Tokyo, Japan || TKO (Technical submission, standing guillotine choke) || 2 || 1:24 || 16-4
|-
! style=background:white colspan=9 |
|-
|-  bgcolor="CCFFCC"
| 2013-06-23 || Win ||align=left| Yuri Kim || Shoot Boxing 2013: Act 3 || Tokyo, Japan || TKO (Technical submission, standing guillotine choke) || 1 || 2:12 || 15-4
|-  bgcolor="CCFFCC"
| 2013-02-22 || Win ||align=left| Mi-Jeon Chan || Shoot Boxing 2013: Act 1 || Tokyo, Japan || TKO (Referee stoppage, rib injury) || 3 || 1:41 || 14-4
|-  bgcolor="CCFFCC"
| 2012-12-02 || Win ||align=left| Itsuka Yokose || RISE/M-1MC: Infinity || Tokyo, Japan || TKO (Referee stoppage, punches) || 3 || 1:30 || 13-4
|-
! style=background:white colspan=9 |
|-
|-  bgcolor="FFBBBB"
| 2012-08-25 || Loss ||align=left| Mizuki Inoue || Shoot Boxing Girls S-Cup 2012 || Tokyo, Japan || Decision (Unanimous) || 6 (Ex.1) || 3:00 || 12-4
|-
! style=background:white colspan=9 |
|-
|-  bgcolor="CCFFCC"
| 2012-06-03 || Win ||align=left| Rio Kamikaze || Shoot Boxing 2012: Road To S-Cup, Act 3 || Tokyo, Japan || Decision (Unanimous) || 3 || 3:00 || 12-3
|-
! style=background:white colspan=9 |
|-
|-  bgcolor="FFBBBB"
| 2012-02-05 || Loss ||align=left| Mizuki Inoue || Shoot Boxing 2012: Road To S-Cup, Act 1 || Tokyo, Japan || Decision (Unanimous) || 4 (Ex.1) || 3:00 || 11-3
|-  bgcolor="CCFFCC"
| 2011-06-05 || Win ||align=left| Rena Kubota || Shoot Boxing 2011 Act 3: SB169 || Tokyo, Japan || Decision (Unanimous) || 5 || 3:00 || 11-2
|-
! style=background:white colspan=9 |
|-
|-  bgcolor="CCFFCC"
| 2011-04-23 || Win ||align=left| Emi Fujino || Shoot Boxing 2011 Act 2: SB168 || Tokyo, Japan || TKO (Corner stoppage) || 1 || 1:17 || 10-2
|-  bgcolor="CCFFCC"
| 2011-02-19 || Win ||align=left| Zaza Sor. Aree || Shoot Boxing 2011 Act 1: SB166 || Tokyo, Japan || TKO (Referee stoppage, knees) || 2 || 2:55 || 9-2
|-  bgcolor="CCFFCC"
| 2010-11-23 || Win ||align=left| Karina Hallinan || Shoot Boxing World Tournament 2010 || Tokyo, Japan || Decision (Unanimous) || 3 || 3:00 || 8-2
|-  bgcolor="FFBBBB"
| 2010-08-29 || Loss ||align=left| Rena Kubota || Shoot Boxing Girls S-Cup 2010, final || Tokyo, Japan || Decision (Unanimous) || 5 (Ex.2) || 2:00 || 7-2
|-  bgcolor="CCFFCC"
| 2010-08-29 || Win ||align=left| Mei Yamaguchi || Shoot Boxing Girls S-Cup 2010, semi-final || Tokyo, Japan || Decision (Unanimous) || 4 (Ex.1) || 2:00 || 7-1
|-  bgcolor="CCFFCC"
| 2010-08-29 || Win ||align=left| Christina Jurjevic || Shoot Boxing Girls S-Cup 2010, quarterfinal || Tokyo, Japan || Decision (Unanimous) || 3 || 2:00 || 6-1
|-  bgcolor="CCFFCC"
| 2010-07-31 || Win ||align=left| Emiko Matsumoto || Jewels 9th Ring || Tokyo, Japan || TKO (Referee stoppage, punches) || 3 || 1:19 || 5-1
|-
! style=background:white colspan=9 |
|-
|-  bgcolor="CCFFCC"
| 2010-05-23 || Win ||align=left| Yukino Oishi || Jewels 8th Ring || Tokyo, Japan || Decision (Unanimous) || 3 || 2:00 || 4-1
|-
! style=background:white colspan=9 |
|-
|-  bgcolor="CCFFCC"
| 2010-03-19 || Win ||align=left| Asako Saioka || Jewels 7th Ring || Tokyo, Japan || TKO (Referee stoppage, chin injury) || 2 || 1:08 || 3-1
|-
! style=background:white colspan=9 |
|-
|-  bgcolor="CCFFCC"
| 2009-11-18 || Win ||align=left| Harumi || Shoot Boxing 2009: Takeshi Road -bushido- The Fifth || Tokyo, Japan || TKO (Referee stoppage) || 2 || 1:51 || 2-1
|-
|-  bgcolor="FFBBBB"
| 2009-08-23 || Loss ||align=left| Saori Ishioka || Shoot Boxing Girls Tournament 2009|| Tokyo, Japan || Decision (Unanimous) || 3 || 2:00 || 1-1
|-
|-  bgcolor="CCFFCC"
| 2009-06-28 || Win ||align=left| Kanako Oka || Young Caesar Cup Tokyo 2009 || Tokyo, Japan || Decision (Unanimous) || 4 (Ex.1) || 2:00 || 1-0
|-
! style=background:white colspan=9 |
|-
| colspan=9 | Legend:

See also
List of female kickboxers

References

External links
Official blog 
Official blog (old) 
Profile at Shoot boxing 

1982 births
Japanese female kickboxers
Japanese female karateka
Living people
People from Chiba (city)